Bufanolide is a C24 steroid and, indirectly, a parent structure of bufadienolide. Its derivatives was found in Bufo and Scilla, as an aglycone of cardiac glycosides and is usually toxic.

References

Bufanolides